St. George's College is a private Jesuit boys high school in Harare, Zimbabwe. The school, colloquially referred to as Saints or George's, is located in Borrowdale, a Harare suburb. The land was donated to the Jesuits. This led to the relocation of the school site from Bulawayo to Harare, the foundation of St. George's College. On the same site, a preparatory primary school was established, called Hartmann House (HH). This site is next to the official Zimbabwe State House, and the official president's house called Zimbabwe House. The school motto is Ex Fide Fiducia, a Latin phrase meaning "From Faith Comes Confidence".

In the past, St. Michael's Preparatory School (Grades 1–3) in Borrowdale would often start a pupil's journey to St. George's. Boys would attend Grades 1–3 before joining Hartmann House, where they would complete their Grades 4–7. However, at the beginning of 2017, with the introduction of Grades 1–3 at Hartmann House following its extension, the case has changed. It is, however, not a prerequisite to have studied at Hartmann House upon entering St. George's College.

St. George's College was ranked 5th out of the top 100 best high schools in Africa by Africa Almanac in 2003, based upon the calibre of education, student engagement, strength and activities of alumni, school profile, internet and news visibility. St. George's College was also ranked as one of the Top 10 High Schools in Zimbabwe in 2014.

St. George's College is a member of the Association of Trust Schools (ATS). The current Headmaster, Mr John Farrelly, is a member of the Conference of Heads of Independent Schools in Zimbabwe (CHISZ) and an international member of the Headmasters' and Headmistresses' Conference (HMC).

History 
St. George's College was founded in 1896 by a French Jesuit, Fr. Marc Barthélemy, SJ, who opened the doors of a small corrugated-iron, two-windowed hut to admit the first six pupils to Bulawayo Boys' School in Bulawayo, the second largest city in Zimbabwe (formerly Southern Rhodesia). In 1898, a permanent building was erected, and in December of that year, at the first prize-giving ceremony, the school assumed the title St. George's Boys' Public School. In 1899, Fr. Francis Johanny, SJ joined the staff and set up the Cadet Corps. Three years later, Fr. Thomas Gardner, SJ, the first English Jesuit arrived. In the same year, in 1902, the first Rhodes' Scholarships were awarded in Southern Rhodesia, and they went to the St. George's scholars: Albert Bisset and Woodford Gilbert. In 1912, the first permanent buildings were completed and opened by Earl Grey.

St. George's College moved to Salisbury (now Harare) in 1926. The architect of the buildings was Fr. Louis Lebœuf, SJ; the main builder was Br. John Conway, SJ. The Beit Hall was established in 1935 by Sir Robert Stanley. In 1940, the Fr. Crehan Library was built, then the Monastery, and later, the Priory. In 1955, the new Dormitory Wing and Laboratories were built, and in 1973 the permanent Chapel was erected.

In the years before Zimbabwe's independence in 1980, the then Southern Rhodesia's government schools were segregated; St. George's College, being a private school, was allowed a limited black intake and was multiracial. It had admitted its first black pupil in 1963.

Academics 
St. George's College is a selective school: an entrance examination must be taken to enter Form One, even by students from Hartmann House. 'A' grades at Ordinary (O) level are requisite to enter the Lower Sixth Form, with those already at the College not exempt from this requirement. The study of religious education is obligatory throughout the six years.

St. George's College follows the Cambridge International Examinations (CIE) syllabus at IGCSE, AS, and A level.

The house system 

The school has a family-oriented approach to academic and extracurricular studies; every student belonging to his own house. There are four houses, identified by colour, and named after the prominent Jesuits who were amongst the founding fathers of the school in Bulawayo:
 Fr. Marc Barthélemy, SJ: first Rector (French, 1896–1913), Dark Green Vests.
 Fr. Thomas Gardner, SJ: first English Jesuit, an anthropologist and a champion of the Cadets, Red Vests.
 Fr. Andrew Hartmann, SJ: chaplain to The Pioneer Column in 1890, Dark Blue Vests.
 Fr. Francis Johanny, SJ: second Rector in 1914, Yellow Vests.

The house system commenced in 1938 with only three houses: Barthélemy, Gardner, and Hartmann. Johanny was created in 1983, as the number of students gradually increased. Each scholar, referred to as a Saint's boy, inherits the house of his previous relative (predecessor); 'new' boys are allocated their houses on a random basis.

The Grant of Arms 
The Grant of Arms was fashioned by the College of Arms on 19 October 1931, and aimed to recognise three outstanding characteristics:
 The first denoted the foundation and management of the college by the Jesuits, signified by the inclusion of two black wolves and the cauldron, as taken from the family arms of Saint Ignatius of Loyola the founder of the Society of Jesus (Jesuit Fathers); in the Basque language "loy-" means wolf and "-olla" means cauldron.
 The second characteristic – that of the location of the college in the then Rhodesia and a play on the Greek word "Rhoden", meaning rose – is symbolised by an attractive flower that exists in various forms, colours, and fragrances. It is hardy and can flourish almost anywhere precisely because it is a hybrid of so many varieties (these should be the qualities of a St. George's boy, in particular: "A Man For and With Others").
 The third characteristic is the dedication to Saint George, the college's patron Saint, as depicted by the inclusion of the red cross from his banner, and the hilt of the sword facing upwards. This symbolises the Saint's victorious triumph, and incidentally that of Christianity over the powers of evil (as represented by the dragon's wings) and our redemption through the death of Jesus Christ.
The motto on the scroll, Ex Fide Fiducia, means "From Faith Comes Confidence".

Alumni 
In 1921, the Old Georgian's Association was formed; its first president was Mr. D. Blackbeard. St. George's College Alumni, known as Old Georgians (OGs), include Rhodes' Scholars who attended Oxford University, Cambridge University, and Ivy League universities. Alumni who "donned the Red Blazer", achieving the arduous task of attending St. Michael's, Hartmann House, and St. George's College, are known as Old Michaelians or Reds.

Notable alumni

Publications 
The Chronicle has been published every year since 1933, with the exception of a few years during the Second World War. In 1996, to mark the centenary of St George's College, a book written by Maj Terence McCarthy was published – Men For Others.

See also 

 Hartmann House Preparatory School
 List of schools in Zimbabwe
 List of boarding schools
 Arundel School
 List of Jesuit sites

Notes
 saints genius

References

External links 

 
 Life at Saints An American teacher's experience at St George's in 1995
 TEX.co.uk Pride of Harare, Times Educational Supplement, 1 March 2002, Mark Olden

Educational institutions established in 1896
Schools in Harare
Education in Bulawayo
Private schools in Zimbabwe
Cambridge schools in Zimbabwe
Day schools in Zimbabwe
Boarding schools in Zimbabwe
Boys' schools in Zimbabwe
Boys' high schools in Zimbabwe
Catholic schools in Zimbabwe
Catholic secondary schools in Zimbabwe
Jesuit schools in Zimbabwe
Member schools of the Association of Trust Schools
Member schools of the Headmasters' and Headmistresses' Conference
1896 establishments in the British Empire